Tony Scalzo (born May 5, 1964) is an American rock musician and songwriter best known as the lead singer of the band Fastball.

Early and personal life
Tony Scalzo was born in Hawaii to a mother from Arizona and an Italian-American father from New Jersey but moved quite often as a child because his father was a U.S. Marine. Scalzo learned to play guitar as a teen. He attended Tustin High School in Tustin, California. Scalzo began playing bass guitar in the 1980s and soon began forming bands. He has four children: Scarlett, Claudia, Gabriel, and Henry Scalzo.

Career
In 1992, Scalzo left his punk/pop group The Goods and made the decision to relocate to Austin, Texas to join the Beaver Nelson Band. However, he ended up leaving the group and helped form the band Fastball. The new group was composed of Scalzo and two of his former bandmates, Joey Shuffield and Miles Zuniga. Fastball was signed by Hollywood Records and began touring the country. Their second album had Top Ten hits in six countries in the middle of 1998, and the album soon went platinum. Scalzo describes his success as being "a big homegrown thing." Scalzo also wrote their hit song, "The Way".

In 2013, Scalzo released his first studio album, My Favorite Year. It was engineered by Joe Blaney, who helped to engineer The Clash's fifth album Combat Rock. Work on the album started on 2011, when Tony started a Kickstarter program. Some of the songs were co-written with his Fastball colleague Miles Zuniga and were intended to be Fastball tracks, but were not included in any of the band's records.

Discography

Fastball

Solo
My Favorite Year (2013)

Filmography
Screw Cupid (2007) (completed) (writer: "Lonely Heart")
Summer Catch (2001) (writer: "Every Time She Walks")
Loser (2000) (writer: "Out Of My Head")
"Charmed"  Fastball (1 episode, 2000)

See also
Music of Austin

References

External links
Official Fastball website

1964 births
Living people
American people of Italian descent
American rock bass guitarists
American male bass guitarists
American rock keyboardists
American rock singers
American rock songwriters
American male singer-songwriters
Musicians from Honolulu
Guitarists from Hawaii
20th-century American bass guitarists
20th-century American male musicians
Singer-songwriters from Hawaii